Dongdaesan (동대산) is the name of several mountains in South Korea:
 Dongdaesan (Gangwon), in Pyeongchang and Gangneung, Gangwon Province, 1,434 metres
 Dongdaesan (North Gyeongsang), in Pohang and Yeongdeok, North Gyeongsang Province, 791 metres
 Dongdaesan (Ulsan), 447 metres
 Dongdae Mountains